Elizabeth Kay Dillon (née Hillman; born December 14, 1960) is a United States district judge of the United States District Court for the Western District of Virginia.

Biography

Dillon received an Artium Baccalaureus degree, magna cum laude, in 1983 from Lenoir–Rhyne University. She received a Juris Doctor in 1986 from Wake Forest University School of Law. She began her legal career at Woods, Rogers & Hazlegrove, PLC, from 1986 to 1998. From 1999 to 2000, she was a shareholder at Guynn & Dillon, PC, a predecessor to her later law firm. From 2000 to 2003, she worked as an Assistant City Attorney for the City of Roanoke. From 2003 to 2014, she had been a shareholder at Guynn, Memmer & Dillon, PC, where she handled both trial and appellate matters in Federal and State courts.

Federal judicial service

On September 18, 2014, President Barack Obama nominated Dillon to serve as a United States District Judge of the United States District Court for the Western District of Virginia, to the seat vacated by Judge Samuel Grayson Wilson, who retired on July 31, 2014. She received a hearing before the United States Senate Committee on the Judiciary on November 13, 2014. On December 11, 2014 her nomination was reported out of committee by voice vote. On Saturday, December 13, 2014 Senate Majority Leader Harry Reid filed a motion to invoke cloture on the nomination. On December 16, 2014, Reid withdrew his cloture motion on Dillon's nomination, and the Senate proceeded to vote to confirm Dillon in a voice vote. She received her federal judicial commission on December 19, 2014.

Mountain Valley Pipeline 
Dillon has been criticized for several decisions surrounding the Mountain Valley Pipeline in Southwest Virginia. On May 4, 2018, Dillon found 61 year old Theresa 'Red' Terry in contempt of court for protesting the pipeline while on her own land, threatening a $1000/day fine and use of U.S. Marshals to forcibly remove her. The land has been in Terry's family for 7 generations  On May 16, 2018 Dillon found two farmers in contempt of court for encouraging a tree sit on their property

References

External links

1960 births
Living people
American women lawyers
American lawyers
Judges of the United States District Court for the Western District of Virginia
Lenoir–Rhyne University alumni
Lawyers from Omaha, Nebraska
People from Roanoke, Virginia
United States district court judges appointed by Barack Obama
21st-century American judges
Virginia lawyers
Wake Forest University School of Law alumni
21st-century American women judges